The 1961–62 Divizia B was the 22nd season of the second tier of the Romanian football league system.

The format has been maintained to three series, each of them having 14 teams. At the end of the season the winners of the series promote to Divizia A and the last two places from each series relegate to Regional Championship.

Team changes

To Divizia B
Promoted from Regional Championship
 Crișul Oradea
 ASMD Satu Mare
 Carpați Sinaia
 Ceahlăul Piatra Neamț
 CFR Arad
 Rapid Târgu Mureș
 Știința Galați

Relegated from Divizia A
 CSMS Iași
 Farul Constanța
 Corvinul Hunedoara

From Divizia B
Relegated to Regional Championship
 Unirea Iași
 CFR Electroputere Craiova
 Gloria Bistrița
 Rulmentul Bârlad
 Drobeta Turnu-Severin
 Dinamo Barza

Promoted to Divizia A
 Metalul Târgoviște
 Dinamo Pitești
 Jiul Petroșani

Excluded teams 
Dinamo Săsar disbanded at the end of the previous season.

Renamed teams 
Academia Militară București was renamed as Olimpia București.

AMEF Arad was renamed as Vagonul Arad.

CFR Timișoara was renamed as CSO Timișoara.

CSM Brăila was renamed as CSO Brăila.

SNM Constanța was renamed as Portul Constanța.

League tables

Serie I

Serie II

Serie III

See also 

 1961–62 Divizia A

References

Liga II seasons
Romania
2